Germar is a German-language masculine given name and surname:

Given name 
 Germar Rudolf (born 1964), a German chemist and Holocaust denier

Family name 
 Ernst Friedrich Germar (1786–1853), a German professor, director of the Mineralogical Museum at Halle, and an entomologist
 Manfred Germar (born 1935), a West German athlete
 Germar (noble house) is a Thuringian noble family from Görmar, Mühlhausen

References 

German masculine given names
German-language surnames